Andrey Romanov (born 10 July 1979 in Moscow) is a Russian auto racing driver and director of MTV/NRG.

Career
He has driven in the Russian Lada Cup and the Russian Honda Civic Cup, as well as the Russian Touring Car Championship. In 2007 he finished as runner-up in the German ADAC Procar Series. He also competed in the FIA World Touring Car Championship in 2007 and 2008. He drove a BMW 320si for the Liqui Moly Team Engstler alongside Franz Engstler. His best race finish was a ninth place in the final round in Macau in 2008.

Romanov raced in ADAC Procar in 2009 for Maurer Motorsport, before returning to the WTCC with Engstler in 2010.

Racing record

Complete World Touring Car Championship results
(key) (Races in bold indicate pole position) (Races in italics indicate fastest lap)

References

1979 births
Living people
Sportspeople from Moscow
Russian racing drivers
World Touring Car Championship drivers
ADAC GT Masters drivers
European Touring Car Cup drivers

Engstler Motorsport drivers